Elektronika B3-21 (Cyrillic: Электроника Б3-21) was the first Soviet programmable calculator. It was released in 1977 and was sold initially for 350 rubles (190 in 1980-81, and just 80 rubles at late 1981). For comparison, 120 rubles was a monthly engineer's salary. Production was stopped in 1982 because of introduction of more advanced Elektronika B3-34.

Features

 program memory - 60 steps in RAM (no ROM, the code is lost after shut down);
 data memory - 2 operating registers, 7 additional directly addressed registers, 6 loop stack registers;
 accuracy - 8 digits in the Significand(7 if the value includes decimal dot), 2 exponent digits;
 operations - besides 4 arithmetic ones there were 1/x, x2, xy, sqrt(x), exp(x), ln(x), sin(x), cos(x);
 conditional and unconditional branching, subroutine calls;
 speed - 3-5 operations (program steps) per second on average (with xy taking the longest time of about 3 seconds);
 display - red LED seven-segment display, with small lenses in front of each digit (to enlarge the very small LED digits used)
 powered by disc accumulators (4 * 1.25 Volts) or charger.

Derived models

 Elektronika MK-46 - desktop version, differed in having 66 steps of program memory, digital inputs for connecting external devices, and output, e.g. for printer (along with functionality to control them);
 Elektronika MK-64 (and later Elektronika MS-1103) - the same as MK-46 but with internal analog-to-digital conversion (ADC) installed so that several analog inputs could be measured (measurements from -9.99 to 9.99 Volts with accuracy of 0.02 Volts);
 Elektronika MK-47 - rare handheld clone of B3-21, allowing the storage of programs on magnetic memory cards.

External links
 - Detailed description of B3-21 at the online calculator collection site by Viktor T. Toth

Elektronika programmable calculators